The Brock KB-3 is an American autogyro that was designed by Ken Brock, produced by Ken Brock Mfg and introduced in 1985. The aircraft was supplied as a kit for amateur construction and was also available as plans.

Design and development
It features a single main rotor, a single-seat open cockpit without a windshield, tricycle landing gear and a twin cylinder, liquid-cooled, two-stroke, dual-ignition  Rotax 582 engine in pusher configuration.

The aircraft fuselage is made from bolted-together aluminum tubing. Its  diameter rotor has two blades. Factory available options included a main rotor pre-rotator, a rotor brake and an instrument package.

Due to its small size and light weight the KB-3 is easy to transport by trailer and can be set up to fly in ten minutes.

Specifications (KB-3)

References

1980s United States sport aircraft
Homebuilt aircraft
Single-engined pusher autogyros
Ken Brock aircraft